Estradiol dicypionate (EDC), also known as estradiol 3,17β-dicypionate, is an estrogen ester which was never marketed. It is the C3 and C17β cypionate (cyclopentylpropionate) diester of estradiol.

See also
 List of estrogen esters § Estradiol esters

References

Abandoned drugs
Cypionate esters
Estradiol esters
Phenols
Prodrugs
Synthetic estrogens